Rose of the World is a 1925 American silent melodrama film directed by Harry Beaumont, which stars Patsy Ruth Miller, Allan Forrest, and Pauline Garon. The screenplay was written by Julien Josephson and Dorothy Farnum. Based on the 1924 novel of the same name by Kathleen Norris, the film was released by Warner Brothers on November 21, 1925.

The film has no relation to the 1918 film of the same name released by Artcraft Pictures, which is based upon a different novel.

Plot
As described in a film magazine review, a young man who breaks his engagement to one woman to marry another learns after marriage that he is sadly  mismated. The woman to whom he was first engaged also marries and is unhappy. The frivolous wife of the hero dies, however, and his longing turnstoward the woman he once rejected. Her husband is killed, and she and the man who once spurned her plan a happy future together.

Cast list

Preservation
With no prints of Rose of the World located in any film archives, it is a lost film.

References

External links

Stills at silentfilmstillarchive.com
Stills at silenthollywood.com

Warner Bros. films
Films directed by Harry Beaumont
Melodrama films
1925 drama films
1925 films
Silent American drama films
American silent feature films
American black-and-white films
1920s American films